George F. Geist (born June 18, 1955) is an American Republican Party politician, who served in the New Jersey State Senate from 2003 to 2004, where he represented the 4th Legislative District. He had earlier served six terms in the General Assembly, from 1992 to 2003.

Geist was appointed in May 2003 to fill the Senate seat vacated by John J. Matheussen who had been appointed to head the Delaware River Port Authority. Geist served in the Senate as Deputy Republican Whip and served on the Judiciary committee and the State Government Committee. Geist lost to Democrat Fred H. Madden in 2004 in what was the most expensive in New Jersey State Senate history reaching over $4.2 million, breaking the previous record spending of $1.8 million. After a recount, Madden held on to win with a 63-vote margin. Geist received a B.A. from Ursinus College with a major in Political Science, and was awarded a J.D. from Rutgers University. Geist was a lawyer.

References

External links
, New Jersey Legislature. Accessed March 14, 2008.

1955 births
Living people
New Jersey lawyers
Republican Party members of the New Jersey General Assembly
Republican Party New Jersey state senators
Rutgers University alumni
Ursinus College alumni